Jacob Whitmer (February 2, 1800 – April 21, 1856) was the second born child of Peter Whitmer, Sr., and Mary Musselman. He is primarily remembered as one of the Eight Witnesses of the Book of Mormon’s golden plates.

Biography
Born in Pennsylvania, Whitmer moved with his parents to New York, where he married Elizabeth Schott on September 29, 1825. Whitmer and Elizabeth had nine children together, only three of whom survived to adulthood.

Whitmer’s younger brother David became a close associate of Joseph Smith. In June 1829, Jacob Whitmer joined his brothers in signing a statement testifying that he personally saw and handled the golden plates said to be in Smith's possession. On April 11, 1830, he was baptized into the newly organized Church of Christ.

Whitmer settled finally near Richmond in neighboring Ray County, where he worked as a shoemaker and a farmer. He died on April 21, 1856, still affirming his testimony of the golden plates.

Notes

References

Keith W. Perkins, "True to the Book of Mormon—The Whitmers", Ensign, February 1989.

1800 births
1856 deaths
American Latter Day Saints
Book of Mormon witnesses
Converts to Mormonism
Farmers from Missouri
Leaders in the Church of Christ (Latter Day Saints)
People excommunicated by the Church of Christ (Latter Day Saints)
People from Caldwell County, Missouri
People from Clay County, Missouri
People from Fayette, New York
People from Ray County, Missouri
Religious leaders from New York (state)
Whitmer family